Gruoch ingen Boite was a Scottish queen, the daughter of Boite mac Cináeda, son of Cináed II. She is most famous for being the wife and queen of MacBethad mac Findlaích (Macbeth). The dates of her life are uncertain.

Life
Gruoch is believed to have been born 1015 or before, the daughter of Boite mac Cináeda; her mother's name is not known. Before 1032 Gruoch was married to Gille Coemgáin mac Maíl Brigti, Mormaer of Moray, with whom she had at least one son, Lulach mac Gille Coemgáin, later King of Scots. Gille Coemgáin was killed in 1032, burned to death in a hall with 50 of his men. The next year one of her male relatives, probably her only brother, was murdered by Malcolm II. After the death of Gille Coemgáin, Gruoch married her husband's cousin, Macbeth. Macbeth may have been responsible for Gille Coemgáin's death, and certainly benefited from it, becoming Mormaer of Moray himself. It is unclear if Macbeth married Gruoch as an ally succoring the widow of a kinsman, or as a conqueror claiming the widow of an enemy. Macbeth killed King Duncan I in 1040 and succeeded him to become King of Alba. Gruoch became his queen. In grants made to the church of St Serf they are identified as "Machbet filius Finlach…et Gruoch filia Bodhe, rex et regina Scottorum", king and queen of Scots.
Gruoch and Macbeth did not have any children, however, Macbeth did accept her son, Lulach, as his heir. Lulach is sometimes mistakenly identified as Macbeth's son, when in fact he was his step-son. Macbeth died 15 August 1057, and Lulach succeeded him to become king of Scots.
It is not known what became of Gruoch or even if she survived Macbeth. Her date of death is not known. Fictional accounts tell of her death by suicide the same year Macbeth died, however, there are no valid sources supporting this.

Gruoch is named with Boite and also with MacBethad in charters endowing the Culdee monastery at Loch Leven.

In fiction 
 Gruoch is the model for the character Lady Macbeth in William Shakespeare's play Macbeth.
The Scottish historical fiction series, The Celtic Blood by Melanie Karsak, centers around Gruoch's life, giving a fictional depiction of what her life could have been like.
 She is the heroine of Gordon Bottomley's 1921 verse drama Gruach, in which the King's Envoy (i.e. Macbeth) sees her sleepwalking on the eve of her marriage to another man, falls in love with her and carries her off. The play mentions her claim to the throne.
 She appears, named Groa, as a major character in Dorothy Dunnett's 1982 novel of Macbeth, King Hereafter, which topped the New York Times bestseller list.
 Gruoch appeared in Nigel Tranter's MacBeth the King as Macbeth's co-ruler and a major character. 
 Gruoch appears in the 1990s TV series Gargoyles. She is seen in flashbacks pertaining to Macbeth, who is a recurring antagonist in the series. This version of Gruoch is based on the historical figure and bears little resemblance to the literary Lady Macbeth.
 Susan Fraser King wrote Lady Macbeth, a 1982 historical novel about Gruoch, whose name she spelt as Gruadh. King asserts that the book is as deeply rooted in fact as possible. Gruadh also appeared in another Susan Fraser King novel, Queen Hereafter, about Margaret of Wessex and a fictional illegitimate daughter of King Lulach. 
 Gruoch also appears as the wife of Macbeth, King of Scotland and the mother of Lulach in Jackie French's children's novel Macbeth and Son, published in 2006.
 Gloria Carreño's 2009 play A Season Before the Tragedy of Macbeth premiered by British Touring Shakespeare 2010, also sheds new light on Gruach Macduff, the central character. The play considers events up to the opening of the letter from the three witches in Shakespeare's tragedy.
 In David Greig's 2010 play Dunsinane, she is known as Gruach and outlives Macbeth.

Notes

References 
 Annals of Ulster (translation ) at University College Cork's CELT project.
 Duncan, A. A. M., The Kingship of the Scots 842–1292: Succession and Independence. Edinburgh University Press, Edinburgh, 2002. 
 Woolf, Alex, "Macbeth" in Michael Lynch (ed.), The Oxford Companion to Scottish History. Oxford UP, Oxford, 2001. 
 Playwright Gloria Carreño
 Une Saison Avant La Tragédie de Macbeth, by Gloria Carreño. Les Editions Persée, 2010. .

11th-century births
11th-century deaths
Scottish royal consorts
House of Moray
Moray
11th-century Scottish women
11th-century Scottish people
Remarried royal consorts
Queen mothers